Khonabad or Khonobod (Russian and Tajik: Хонобод) is a village and jamoat in southern Tajikistan. It is part of the city of Isfara in Sughd Region. The jamoat has a total population of 12,159 (2015). It consists of 6 villages, including Khonabad (the seat), Zarhok and Arabkishlak (Yakkachinor).

References

Populated places in Sughd Region
Jamoats of Tajikistan